Nadvoitsy is the name of several inhabited localities in Segezhsky District of the Republic of Karelia, Russia:

Nadvoitsy, an urban locality (an urban-type settlement)
Nadvoitsy (rural locality), a rural locality (a village)

See also
Pristan Nadvoitsy, a rural locality (a station) in Segezhsky District of the Republic of Karelia